North St Ives is a locality in the suburb of St Ives in northern Sydney, in the state of New South Wales, Australia.

Schools
St Ives North Public School is located in St Ives just up the street from the main shopping centre.

Localities in New South Wales